Tongyun Subdistrict is a subdistrict in Tongzhou District, Beijing. It borders Yongshun and Lucheng Towns in the north, Luyuan Subdistrict in the east, Yuqiao and Zhongcang Subdistrict in the south, and Xinhua Subdistrict in the west. In 2020, the population for this subdistrict was 49,613.

The subdistrict was created in 2018. Its name Tongyun was from Tongyunmen, the east city gate of the old Tongzhou city.

Administrative divisions 
In the year 2021, Tongyun Subdistrict had 10 communities under its administration:

Gallery

See also 

 List of township-level divisions of Beijing

References 

Tongzhou District, Beijing
Subdistricts of Beijing